Thomas Bird, OP, formerly prior of Daventry, was  Bishop of St Asaph from  1450 until his deprivation in 1463.

References 

15th-century English Roman Catholic bishops
Bishops of St Asaph
Dominican bishops